Bhadana or Padana is a major and ruling clan of the Gurjars. who founded and ruled the Bhadanakas in the Medieval Period. Gujjars belonging to this branch are settled in Punjab, Haryana, Kashmir, Delhi, Rajasthan and Uttar Pradesh.

Notable People
 Avtar Singh Bhadana
 Kartar Singh Bhadana
 Amit Bhadana
 Nagender Bhadana

References 

Gurjar clans
Gurjar